Square Shooter, which was also known under the title Quicksand, is a 1935 American Western film directed by David Selman and starring Tim McCoy, Jacqueline Wells, and Erville Alderson.

Cast list
 Tim McCoy as Tim Baxter
 Jacqueline Wells as Sally Wayne
 Erville Alderson as Dr. Wayne
 John Darrow as Johnny Lloyd
 Charles Middleton as Jed] Miller
 J. Farrell MacDonald as Sheriff
 Wheeler Oakman as Jim Thorne
 Steve Clark as Pete

References

External links
 
 
 

Columbia Pictures films
American Western (genre) films
1935 Western (genre) films
1935 films
Films directed by David Selman
American black-and-white films
1930s English-language films
1930s American films